Zhang Lin may refer to:

 Zhang Lin (dissident), (born 1963) a Chinese cyber-dissident from Anhui, China
 Zhang Lin (general), (born 1965), a Chinese lieutenant general
 Zhang Lin (rower) (born 1983), a Chinese rower
 Zhang Lin (swimmer) (born 1987), a Chinese swimmer from Beijing, China
 Zhang Lin (racewalker) (born 1993), a Chinese racewalker

See also 
 Chang Lin (disambiguation) — "Chang Lin" is the Wade–Giles equivalent of "Zhang Lin" in pinyin